Alfred Joseph Ivie IV (born January 22, 1995) is an American football defensive tackle who is currently a free agent. He played college football at the University of Florida.

Early years
Ivie attended Pasco High School, where he played football for the Pirates for four years, becoming a starter at defensive tackle as a junior, registering 53 tackles (18 for loss). As a senior, Ivie moved to left defensive end and made 89 tackles (8 for loss). Sometimes he lined up at fullback and tight end as well. He also played basketball at center as a freshman.

College career
Ivie accepted a football scholarship from the University of Florida. He is the third generation in his family to attend the school in Gainesville. As a true freshman, he removed his redshirt status late in the season due to the team's depth issues, playing as a backup in three of the last five games.

As a sophomore, Ivie made 24 tackles (3 for loss) and one sack as a backup. As a junior, he started five games, posting 27 tackles (four for loss) and 3.5 sacks. As a junior, he appeared in four games and had 16 total tackles and one forced fumble. As a senior, he started 10 out of 11 games (a broken thumb kept him out of two games), registering 26 tackles (3.5 for loss), 2.5 sacks and seven quarterback hurries.

Ivie spent most of his college career as a nose tackle on a defensive line rotation that included talented players like Jonathan Bullard and Caleb Brantley.

Professional career

Dallas Cowboys
Ivie was selected by the Dallas Cowboys in the seventh round (228th overall) of the 2017 NFL Draft, after posting numbers in his college Pro Day that would have placed him among the top tier of the defensive tackles at the NFL Combine. On May 11, he signed a four-year, $2.48 million contract with a signing bonus of $86,489. He was waived by the Cowboys on September 2, 2017.

Atlanta Falcons
On October 17, 2017, Ivie was signed to the Atlanta Falcons' practice squad. He signed a reserve/future contract with the Falcons on January 15, 2018. He was waived on June 1, 2018.

Seattle Seahawks
On August 6, 2018, Ivie signed with the Seattle Seahawks. He was waived on September 1, 2018.

Kansas City Chiefs
On September 4, 2018, Ivie was signed to the Kansas City Chiefs' practice squad. He signed a reserve/future contract with the Chiefs on January 23, 2019.

In 2019, Ivie made the team after passing defensive tackle Justin Hamilton on the depth chart during preseason. He was waived on September 16, 2019, and re-signed to the practice squad. On November 2, 2019, he was elevated off the practice squad. He was waived on November 22.

Tennessee Titans
Ivie was signed to the Tennessee Titans practice squad on November 26, 2019.   He was promoted to the active roster on December 14, 2019.

On September 5, 2020, Ivie was waived by the Titans.

Cleveland Browns
On September 11, 2020, Ivie was signed to the Cleveland Browns' practice squad. Ivie was elevated to the Browns' active roster on October 10 and November 28 for the team's weeks 5 and 12 games against the Indianapolis Colts and Jacksonville Jaguars, and reverted to the practice squad after each game. He was released on January 9, 2021.

Indianapolis Colts
On July 31, 2021, Ivie signed with the Indianapolis Colts. He was waived on August 23, 2021.

Buffalo Bills
On August 24, 2021, Ivie was claimed off waivers by the Buffalo Bills. He was waived on August 27.

Houston Gamblers
Ivie signed with the Houston Gamblers of the United States Football League on April 28, 2022.

Metaleague
On April 13, 2022, Ivie was part of the team (along with fellow NFL players Alex Bachman, Rodney Adams, and  Jordan Scarlett) that launched the Metaleague  Non-fungible_token project on the Fractal Platform which was founded by Justin Kan, the founder of Twitch.

References

External links
 Kansas City Chiefs bio
 Florida Gators bio

1995 births
Living people
People from Dade City, Florida
Sportspeople from the Tampa Bay area
Players of American football from Florida
Pasco High School (Florida) alumni
American football defensive tackles
Florida Gators football players
Dallas Cowboys players
Atlanta Falcons players
Seattle Seahawks players
Kansas City Chiefs players
Tennessee Titans players
Cleveland Browns players
Indianapolis Colts players
Buffalo Bills players
Houston Gamblers (2022) players